Methylazoxymethanol acetate, MAM, is a neurotoxin which reduces DNA synthesis used in making animal models of neurological diseases including schizophrenia and epilepsy. MAM is found in cycad seeds, and causes zamia staggers. It selectively targets neuroblasts in the central nervous system. In rats, administration of MAM affects structures in the brain which are developing most quickly. It is an acetate of methylazoxymethanol.

MAM animal models

Schizophrenia
In rat models, the specific effect of MAM on neural development depends on the gestational age of the subject. At the seventeenth gestational day (GD17), administration of MAM produces behavioral and histopathological patterns found in schizophrenia. The molecular mechanism behind this model is not fully known. Methylazoxymethanol acetate administered at GD17 reduces the thickness of the hippocampus and the thalamus. The locomotor effects of amphetamines and the spontaneous firing rate of dopaminergic neurons in the ventral tegmental area are increased. In alternating maze tests, GD17 MAM rats quickly learned the first rule, but took longer to accommodate to alterations to the rule; this is thought to indicate deficits in working spatial memory, which is also impaired in schizophrenia. Another study found that mice whom methylazoxy-methanol acetate was administered on 16th gestational day, but not those whom it was adminitred on GD17 showed decreased parvalbumin expression in hippocampus and prefrontal cortex, and schizophrenia-like characteristics. Mice whom MAM was administered on GD16 also exhibited reduced size of hippocampus and thinning of the prefrontal cortex. PFC-dependent cognitive deficits were shown only in male MAM-treated mice.

Epilepsy
Exposure to MAM before birth increases susceptibility to epileptic seizures caused by flurothyl. Prenatal MAM exposure in rats results in a model of brain malformation.  In some MAM animals, video-EEG monitoring has documented the presence of spontaneous electrographic seizure activity  In some epilepsy rat models, MAM is administered at the fifteenth gestational day. Previous studies have found impaired cognitive function in GD15 MAM rats, and a reduced seizure threshold.  At the cellular level, dysplastic hippocampal neurons in the MAM model were shown to have reduced potassium current function and expression for the Kv4.2 channel subunit   These findings may contribute to the spontaneous seizures and reduced seizure thresholds seen in this model.

References

Acetate esters
IARC Group 2B carcinogens
Azo compounds